The Professor Layton video game series is a franchise of puzzle games produced and developed by Level-5, with some games being published by Nintendo outside Japan. The series is primarily based on games for the Nintendo DS and Nintendo 3DS systems.

The series focuses on Professor Hershel Layton, an archaeologist, and his apprentice, Luke Triton, and their investigations into various mysterious towns. Often, they encounter people who require the player to solve puzzles or brain teasers in exchange for small trinkets or picarats, which is the score system used within the games. Currently there are six games in the main series, all of which have been released outside Japan. Additionally, there have been three novels as well as an animated movie, Professor Layton and the Eternal Diva. The series has been financially successful, with over 15 million units having been shipped of the games alone. The idea for the franchise was conceived by Akihiro Hino, and was originally intended to be a successor to Nintendo's Brain Age series.

Video games

Main series

Crossover games

Other games

Other media

Animated movies

Printed media

Novels

Manga

Soundtracks

References

External links
Professor Layton series official website 
Professor Layton series official website
Layton-kyōju VS Gyakuten Saiban official website 

Media lists by video games franchise
Professor Layton
Mass media by franchise